Ovide Laflamme (10 December 1925 – 29 June 1993) was a Liberal party member of the House of Commons of Canada. He was born in Saint-Damien, Quebec and became a judge and lawyer by career.

He was first elected at the Bellechasse riding in
a 26 September 1955 by-election, then re-elected in the 1957 federal election. After serving his term in the 23rd Canadian Parliament, Laflamme was defeated at Bellechasse in the 1958 by Noël Dorion of the Progressive Conservative party and in the 1962 election by Bernard Dumont of the Social Credit party.

In the 1963 election, Laflamme campaigned at the Québec—Montmorency riding but was again unsuccessful having lost to Guy Marcoux of the Social Credit party. He won Québec—Montmorency in the 1965 election, and was re-elected at the Montmorency riding in the 1968 and 1972 federal elections. After completing his term in May 1974 for the 29th Canadian Parliament, Laflamme left federal office without contesting another federal election.

External links
 

1925 births
1993 deaths
Judges in Quebec
20th-century Canadian judges
Members of the House of Commons of Canada from Quebec
Liberal Party of Canada MPs